Akasha or Akash (Sanskrit  ) means space or sky or æther in traditional Indian cosmology, depending on the religion. The term has also been adopted in Western occultism and spiritualism in the late 19th century. In many modern Indo-Aryan languages and Dravidian languages the corresponding word (often rendered Akash) retains a generic meaning of "sky".

Religious background
The word in Sanskrit is derived from a root  meaning "to be". It appears as a masculine noun in Vedic Sanskrit with a generic meaning of "open space, vacuity". In Classical Sanskrit, the noun acquires the neuter gender and may express the concept of "sky; atmosphere" (Manusmrti, Shatapatha Brahmana).
In Vedantic philosophy, the word acquires its technical meaning of "an ethereal fluid imagined as pervading the cosmos".

Hinduism
In Vedantic Hinduism, akasha means the basis and essence of all things in the material world; the first element created.  A Vedic mantra "pṛthivyāpastejovāyurākāśāt" indicates the sequence of initial appearance of the five basic gross elements. Thus, first appeared the space, from which appeared air, from that fire or energy, from which the water, and therefrom the earth. It is one of the Panchamahabhuta, or "five gross elements"; its main characteristic is Shabda (sound). The direct translation of akasha is the word meaning "upper sky" or 'space' in Hinduism.

The Nyaya and Vaisheshika schools of Hindu philosophy state that akasha or aether is the fifth physical substance, which is the substratum of the quality of sound.  It is the one, eternal, and all-pervading physical substance, which is imperceptible.

According to the Samkhya school, akasha is one of the five Mahābhūtas (grand physical elements) having the specific property of sound.

In the Shiva Purana, it identifies akasha as having "the only attribute of sound".

In the Linga Purana, akasha is translated as "firmament" and listed as one of the 1,008 names of Lord Shiva.

Adherents of the heterodox Cārvāka or Lokāyata philosophy held that this world is made of four elements only. They exclude the fifth, akasha, because its existence cannot be perceived.

Jainism

Akasha is space in the Jain conception of the cosmos. Akasha is one of the six dravyas (substances) and it  accommodates the other five, namely sentient beings or souls (jīva), non-sentient substance or matter (pudgala), principle of motion (dharma), the principle of rest (adharma), and the principle of time (kāla).

It is all-pervading, infinite and made of infinite space-points.

It falls into the Ajiva category, divided into two parts: Loakasa (the part occupied by the material world) and Aloakasa (the space beyond it which is absolutely void and empty). In Loakasa the universe forms only a part. Akasha is that which gives space and makes room for the existence of all extended substances.

At the summit of the lokākāśa is the Siddhashila (abode of the liberated souls).

Buddhism
In Buddhist phenomenology, akasha is divided into limited space (ākāsa-dhātu) and endless space (ajatākasā).

The Vaibhashika, an early school of Buddhist philosophy, hold the existence of akasha to be real.

Ākāsa is identified as the first arūpa jhāna, but usually translates as "infinite space."

Modern reception

The Western mystic-religious philosophy called Theosophy has popularized the word akasha as an adjective, through the use of the term "Akashic records" or "Akashic library", referring to an etheric compendium of all knowledge and history.

Scott Cunningham (1995) uses the term akasha to refer to "the spiritual force that Earth, Air, Fire, and Water descend from".

Ervin László in Science and the Akashic Field: An Integral Theory of Everything (2004), based on ideas by Rudolf Steiner, posits "a field of information" as the substance of the cosmos, which he calls  "Akashic field" or "A-field".

See also
 Ākāśagarbha – a Bodhisattva associated with akasha

References

Classical elements
Hindu philosophical concepts
Hindu given names
Indian masculine given names